The discography of the British beat band Herman's Hermits.

Albums

Studio albums

Compilation albums

Extended plays

UK extended plays

Notes
A  The London Look was a promo-only EP sponsored by Yardley Cosmetics.

Singles

Notes

References

Discographies of British artists
Pop music group discographies